Numbers on the Irish telephone numbering plan are regulated and assigned to operators by ComReg.

Overview

Telephone numbers in Ireland are part of an open numbering plan that allows variations in number length. The Irish format is similar to systems used in many parts of Europe, notably the Netherlands, Sweden, Germany, Belgium and France, where geographical numbers are organised using a logic of large regional prefixes, which are then further subdivided into smaller regions. It differs from UK numbering, which originated as alphanumeric codes based on town names.

Irish Mobile and non–geographic numbers are fixed length and do not support local dialling.

The trunk prefix 0 is used to access numbers outside the local area and for all mobile calls. This is followed by an area code, referred to as a National Dialling Code (NDC), the first digit of which indicates the geographical area or type of service (e.g. mobile).

Calls made from mobile phones and some VoIP systems always require the full area code and phone number.

In common with most European countries, the trunk prefix 0 must be omitted when calling Irish numbers from abroad.

General structure of Irish numbering 

Irish area codes vary in length, between one and three digits (excluding the leading 0), and subscribers' numbers are between five and seven digits.

As optional local dialling is facilitated, Irish geographic numbers cannot begin with 0 (trunk prefix), 1 (special number prefix) or 999 (emergency services). However, mobile numbers use the full range of digits, as local dialling is not supported on mobile networks, and the area code must always be dialled.

A migration to a standard format, 0xx xxx xxxx, is in progress; however, to avoid disruption, this process is only being carried out as needed, where existing area codes and local numbering systems have reached full capacity. There is currently no plan to move to a closed numbering system.

Number formats 

Irish geographic numbers vary in length from area to area, but follow standard formats within each area code.

The area code, or prefix, is normally separated by a space, or less commonly, may be displayed in parentheses (brackets). Numbers are usually grouped into easy to read clusters, separated by spaces or hyphens for ease of use.

The use of spaces is recommended by ComReg for ease of compatibility with online services, such as linking to a phone number in a mobile browser, copying and pasting into mobile diallers etc

Area codes / prefixes are always separated from the subscriber number. Merging or reformatting these tends to cause confusion or make numbers look unfamiliar.

While formats vary, numbers are usually printed (e.g. in telephone directories) as follows:

Geographic:
01 XXX XXXX – Dublin area
0XX XXX XXXX – All other 7-digit areas
0XX XXX XXX – 6-digit areas
0XX XXXXX – 5-digit areas
0X0X XXXXX – 5-digit areas

Non-geographic
1800 XXX XXX – Freephone/Toll Free
0818 XXX XXX – Standard Rate

Mobile
08X XXX XXXX

Mobile M2M (Machine to Machine)
088 XXXXX XXXXX

Alphanumeric dialling, using letters as mnemonics for advertising etc is supported, but is rarely used.

Geographical numbering 

Irish geographical numbering is structured on a regional basis and follows a logical hierarchy.

These directory areas correspond approximately to the following geographical regions:

 01 – Greater Dublin Area
 02 – Cork
 04 – Northeast
 05 – Southeast
 06 – Midwest and Southwest
 07 – Northwest
 09 – West

The Midlands is covered by several regional codes.

Except for the 01 area, each area is further subdivided into smaller areas (NDCs). Usually, the main city or town in the area is 0x1 e.g. 021 (Cork), 061 (Limerick), 091 (Galway).

Regional overview

ComReg maintains a map of area codes here.

Mobile services 
Mobile phone numbers start with the prefix 08x and are part of a closed numbering plan, which means that a mobile phone number must have 10 digits. Calls to landlines and other mobiles require the area code on a mobile phone.

New numbers are assigned on prefixes and ranges managed by a specific operator. However, as full mobile number portability has been in operation since 2003, it is no longer possible to reliably identify which network a particular number is on. For example, a newly assigned Three number would begin with 083, but may have been ported to another operator in the meantime.

Mobile network operators (MNOs)

Mobile virtual network operators (MVNOs)

M2M (Machine to Machine) Communication

Direct to voicemail number
Mobile phone numbers also have their own voicemail number. To access this, the number 5 should be put after the prefix. For example, the mobile number 08x xxx xxxx has the voicemail number 08x 5 xxx xxxx.

On some networks, when the direct to voicemail number is called, the voicemail greeting for that network is played (e.g. Vodafone, eir Mobile), while others request a phone number followed by the voicemail greeting for that number (e.g. Three). Users can press the hash key (#) to gain access to the voicemail box.

Calls to Northern Ireland
Although Northern Ireland is part of the UK numbering plan, a special arrangement exists for calling Northern Irish landlines from the Republic of Ireland.

Calls to Northern Ireland can be dialled using the 048 prefix or by dialling the number in the full international format. Most Irish operators treat calls to Northern Ireland at national or even local rates. Similar charging arrangements apply when calling the Republic of Ireland from Northern Ireland.

For example, to reach Belfast landline 90xx xxxx, subscribers can dial either 048 90xx xxxx or 00 44 28 90xx xxxx.

Northern Ireland mobile phones use the same mobile numbering and networks as other parts of the UK – calls must be dialled using the 00 44 7xxx xxx xxx format.

International calls

In common with all EU countries, the international access code is 00.

Numbers should be dialled as follows: 00 – country code – area code – local number.

All mobile phones and some VoIP services also support the international E.164 number format, so a + may be optionally used instead of 00.

Reserved numbers 
03 – reserved for future changes in the numbering plan
07 – all except 0707, 0700, 071, 074 and 076 are reserved without assigned purpose
0707 – reserved for personal numbering
0800 – reserved

Special numbers 
00 – international access
020 91x xxxx – drama use (although the rest of 020 is free)
0700 – personal numbering
076 – VoIP services – (being withdrawn.) 
080 – mailbox for landline users (formerly access code for Northern Ireland)
089 011 0xxx – drama use

Speed dial short numbers to contact carriers 

1901 – eir
1902 – Digiweb
1903 – Tesco Mobile
1904 – BT Ireland
1905 – eir mobile
1907 – Vodafone Ireland
1908 – Virgin Mobile Ireland
1913 – Three Ireland
1910 – Magnet Networks
1977 – NUACOM Ireland

Operator services 
General operator assistance no longer exists in Ireland.
118xx – Directory enquiries (multiple commercial providers offer a variety of services in this number range)

Emergency services 
The emergency number for Ireland is 112. This is harmonised across the EU.

To avoid confusion, the long–established 999 continues to be advertised alongside 112. Either number can be dialed.

Services provided
Ambulance
Garda Síochána
Fire and rescue
Irish Coast Guard
Cliff and mountain rescue

SMS emergency service

112 can also be contacted by SMS. While the service is open to all users, it is primarily aimed at the deaf community.

Pre-registration used to be required.

Premium rate numbers

Premium rate voice
Irish premium rate telephone numbers start with 15 and are read in two-digit blocks e.g. 1550 is "fifteen fifty".

The rates given below are from ComReg and are indicative only. One must check with their specific telephone service provider for exact rates.

Premium rate SMS

A special 50XXX code is used for free–of–charge SMS.

Premium rate services in Ireland are regulated by ComReg.

Non–geographic numbers (Freephone & Standard rate)

Irish non-geographic numbers consist of two national prefixes and the international freephone service.

 0818 – Charged as landline call, and are included in bundled minutes. 6-digit numbers in the format 0818 XXX XXX
 1800 – Freephone / toll free (from all Irish mobile and landlines. 6-digit numbers in the format 1800 xxx xxx
 00 800 – Freephone / toll free (from all Irish mobile and landlines. 8-digit numbers in the format 00 800 xxxx xxxx

Where high volume 'bursty traffic' is anticipated, such as on-air radio competition lines, the first two digits of the phone number are always 71. For example:
1800 71x xxx or 0818 71x xxx. This allows the telephone network to manage traffic during number analysis, even before the call is routed.

Ireland's non-geographic numbers and pricing structures were simplified and old shared-cost prefixes were withdrawn on 1 January 2022.
These changes mean that calls to non-geographic numbers are either freephone, or always included in call bundles, ensuring consumers are not confused by out of bundle, or other unusual charges.

Due to the COVID-19 crisis, several numbers in the 1850 and 1890 ranges will remain in service until 2023. This is to avoid disruption to essential health services during a time of high volumes of calls. These will remain in service until 30 November 2023, alongside new numbers that have replaced them. Advertising of these numbers will cease. Calls to these numbers will be charged on the same basis as calls to landlines or 0818 and included in call bundles.

Freephone numbers are free to call from mobile handsets; however, the recipient can elect to refuse mobile–originated calls or choose to accept calls only from predefined geographical region(s).

NB: 1800 can only be dialled from within Ireland. Numbers should never be printed or presented in the international format +353 1800 as these clash with working Dublin landline numbers in the 01 area +353 1 800 xxxx. Alternative geographic numbers, or an 0818 number should be used instead, if international access is required.

Following a 2019 review of non–geographic numbers Comreg decided to withdraw and close the 1850, 1890 and 076 number ranges by 1 January 2022. During the transition period, these ranges were geo–rated (charged as if they are geographical numbers).

From August 2019, various telecoms providers announced price changes which took effect on, or just before, 1 December 2019, including Virgin Media Business, in2tel, Virgin Media, eir, Tesco Mobile, Three, Digiweb, Pure Telecom, 48 months and Sky.

From 1 January 2022 callers to the withdrawn prefixes receive recorded announcements.

Internet access numbers 
1891 – reduced cost internet access (possibly timed)
1892 – local rate internet access (timed)
1893 – variable cost internet access (timed)

Carrier selection (per call) 
13xxx – carrier selection (third party long distance, international and internet services). These codes override the default carrier.
Carrier preselect is normally used where the exchange automatically uses the customer's preferred provider(s).

Network engineering codes 
199xxx... – network operator-specific engineering codes (undefined length). These codes are generally not published.

Line information codes 
These services give the user more information about their phone line (applicable only to lines provided using the OpenEir access network.)

Check phone number associated with line / automatic number announcement circuit (ANAC) 
199000 – reads out the subscriber's telephone number.

Check preset carrier 
Check which carrier a subscriber is using for each category of call:
19800 – international calls
19822 – local calls
19801 – calls to other parts of the Republic of Ireland, Irish mobile numbers and landlines in Northern Ireland.

Voicemail
171 – used to access voicemail on all networks: fixed line (POTS and Cable), all mobile operators and many VoIP providers.

Call management services / supplementary service codes 
Special short codes are used to control various supplementary services offered by digital local exchanges. These services were first introduced as PhonePlus in 1981, on the first generation of Alcatel E10 and Ericsson AXE digital exchanges used in Ireland, and were rolled out nationally throughout the 1980s.

These services are available on all Irish PSTN lines, regardless of operator. There is a more expansive range of services available, but these are the most commonly used. Different codes apply on cable telephony lines, such as those provided by Virgin Media Ireland and on VoIP providers.

PSTN lines and some ISDN services

Caller ID services
141 – caller ID default override – withhold caller ID on this call
142 – caller ID default override – present caller ID on this call
1471  – check last missed call. The system will verbally announce details of the last missed call
#93# – delete missed call information from network memory

Call waiting
*43# – setup
*#43# – check status
#43# – cancel

Answering call waiting
R0 – reject call (or send to voicemail) and temporarily suspend call waiting service for this call.
R1 – answer waiting call and disconnect current call.
R2 – answer waiting call and place current call on hold/or swap between calls.
R3 – merge both calls into a three–way call.

Conference/three–way calling
While on a phone call a subscriber can press the R key on their phone and dial the number they wish to add to the conversation.
Dial R3 to begin conference/three–way call.
R2 allows a subscriber to separate the calls and swap between them.

Call hold / transfer to another extension 
R – places call on hold. Hang up and telephone will ring until call on hold is picked up again.

Call forwarding (unconditional)
*21*(phone number)# – forward all calls to (phone number)
*#21# – check status
#21# – deactivate

When this service is active, the dial tone changes to a two–frequency 'siren' tone.

Alarm / reminder call
*55*[time in 4–digit 24h format]# e.g. for 8:30 am dial *55*0830#
*#55# – check status
#55# – cancel

Most exchanges confirm setup with a verbal announcement; however, some exchanges may use a ringing tone to indicate successful service setup and a busy tone to indicate an error/invalid code.

Services on Virgin Media Ireland cable network
(Codes are unique to Virgin Media Ireland and do not follow ETSI guidelines)

Caller ID services
141 – caller ID default override – withhold caller ID on this call
142 – caller ID default override – present caller ID on this call

Call forwarding

Call forwarding (unconditional)
#70 – deactivate

Forwarding to voicemail
*75 – activate when busy
#75 – deactivate when busy
*77 – forward if unanswered
#77 – deactivate if unanswered

Call waiting
*72 – activate
#72 – deactivate

Answering call waiting
R1 – answer waiting call and disconnect current call.
R2 – answer waiting call and place current call on hold or swap between calls.

Anonymous call rejection
*90 – activate
#90 – deactivate

Redial last number called
##

The subscriber will either hear a tone or a voice message to confirm services have been set up or deactivated.

Mobiles
GSM supplementary service codes – All of Ireland's mobile providers use the standard GSM codes to control special services such as call forwarding, barring, call waiting etc.

Number changes 

Several major number changes have occurred since 1990. The telephone number changes in Dublin and Cork took several years to complete, as they were busier area codes with few available lead digits. 
Other number changes took place in just one step, with all numbers being changed simultaneously.

To minimise disruption simultaneous working was enabled, allowing old numbers to remain mapped and active for a run-in period of one year. Caller ID only displayed the new numbers. This was followed by recorded announcements which remained active for at least a year, advising callers of the number change. Eventually this would be replaced by a dialling error message.

1990–1994 

Dublin (01) changes to 7-digits.

 All local numbers with the area code 01 changed from 6–digits to 7–digits in five stages between 1990 and 1994:
On 2 April 1990, numbers beginning with 23, 24, 26, 27, 28, 70 and 79 were prefixed with 6.
On 8 April 1991, numbers beginning with 8 and 69 were prefixed with 2.
On 4 April 1992, numbers beginning with 4 and the remaining 6–digit numbers beginning with 2 were prefixed with 8. Numbers beginning with 95 and 98 were prefixed with 2.
On 24 April 1993, numbers beginning with 75, 780, 781, 782, 783 and 784 were prefixed with 4, while numbers beginning with 60, 61, 68, 71, 76, 77, 785and 789 were prefixed with 6, and numbers beginning with 72, 73, 74, 786, 787 and 788 were prefixed with 8.
On 16 April 1994, numbers beginning with 3 were prefixed with 8, while numbers beginning with 5 and 9 were prefixed with 4.

1998–2000 

Cork (021) changes to 7 digits.

 All local numbers with the area code 021 changed from 6–digits to 7–digits in two stages.
 From September 1998, numbers beginning with 40 were prefixed with 2, while numbers beginning with 43 and 33 were prefixed by 7.
 From February 2000, numbers beginning with 2, 3, 5, 6, 7, 8 or 9 were prefixed with 4.

2000–2001 
 All local numbers with the area code 041 changed from 5–digit to 7–digit. Numbers in the Drogheda minimum numbering area (MNA) were prefixed by 98 and in the Ardee MNA by 68.
 All local numbers with the area code 042 changed from 5–digit to 7–digit. Numbers in the Dundalk MNA were prefixed by 93, in the Carrickmacross MNA by 96 and the Castleblayney MNA by 97.
 All local numbers with the area code 049 changed from 5–digit to 7–digit. Numbers in the Cavan MNA were prefixed by 43, in the Cootehill MNA by 55, in the Oldcastle MNA by 85 and the Belturbet MNA by 95.
 All local numbers with the area code 065 changed from 5–digit to 7–digit. Numbers in the Ennis MNA were prefixed by 68, in the Ennistymon MNA by 70 and the Kilrush MNA by 90.
 All local numbers with the area code 066 changed from 5–digit to 7–digit. Numbers in the Tralee MNA were prefixed by 71, in the Dingle MNA by 91, in the Cahirciveen MNA by 94 and the Killorglin MNA by 97.
 The prefix 080 was previously used for calls to Northern Ireland, but this changed to 048 following the Big Number Change.

2002–2003 

 Area codes in parts of counties Meath and Offaly were merged into the single area code 046, including Navan, Nobber, Kells, Trim, Enfield and Edenderry. The 0405 area code was abolished. All local numbers became 7–digit.
 All local numbers with the area code 056 changed from 5–digit to 7–digit. Numbers in the Kilkenny MNA were prefixed by 77, in the Castlecomer MNA by 44 and the Freshford MNA by 88.
 Area codes in County Carlow and parts of counties Kildare, Kilkenny, Laois and Wicklow were merged into a new area code 059, including Carlow, Muine Bheag, Athy and Baltinglass. The area codes abolished were 0503, 0507 and 0508. All local numbers became 7–digit.
 Area codes in County Sligo and County Leitrim and parts of counties Cavan, Donegal and Roscommon were merged into the single area code 071, including Sligo, Boyle, Carrick-on-Shannon, Drumshanbo, Manorhamilton. The area codes abolished were 072, 078 and 079. All local numbers became 7–digit.
 The majority of area codes in County Donegal were merged into the single area code 074, including Letterkenny, Lifford, Ramelton, Buncrana, Dungloe and Donegal. The area codes abolished were 073, 075 and 077. All local numbers became 7–digit.
 Area codes in parts of counties Galway, Offaly, Roscommon, Westmeath and Longford were merged into a new area code 090, including Athlone, Banagher (North), Ballinasloe, Roscommon, Portumna. The area codes abolished were 0902, 0903 and 0905. All local numbers became 7–digit.
 Area codes in parts of counties Galway, Mayo, Roscommon and Sligo were merged into the single area code 094, including Castlebar, Swinford, Claremorris, Ballinrobe, Castlerea and Ballaghaderreen. The area codes abolished were 0907 and 092. All local numbers became 7–digit.

2005–2007 

 All local numbers with the area code 044 changed from 5–digit to 7–digit. Numbers in the Rochfortbridge MNA were prefixed by 92, in the Mullingar MNA by 93 and the Castlepollard MNA by 96.
 Area codes in County Wexford and parts of counties Carlow and Wicklow were merged into the single area code 053, including Wexford, Enniscorthy, Ferns and Gorey. The area codes abolished were 054and 055. All local numbers became 7–digit.
 Area codes in counties Laois and Offaly and parts of counties Galway and Westmeath were merged into the single area code 057, including Portlaoise, Abbeyleix, Tullamore and Birr. The area codes abolished were 0502, 0506 and 0509. All local numbers became 7–digit.

2009–2010 

 All local numbers with the area code 023 changed from 5–digit to 7–digit. Numbers in the Bandon MNA beginning with 2, 3, 4, 5, 7 and 8 were prefixed by 88, while numbers beginning with 6 were prefixed by 66.
 All local numbers with the area code 043 changed from 5–digit to 7–digit. Numbers in the Longford MNA were prefixed by 33 and in the Edgeworthstown MNA by 66.
 All local numbers with the area code 052 changed from 5–digit to 7–digit. Numbers in the Clonmel MNA were prefixed by 61, in the Cahir MNA by 74 and the Killenaule MNA by 91.
 All local numbers with the area code 064 changed from 5–digit to 7–digit. Numbers in the Killarney MNA were prefixed by 66 and in the Rathmore MNA by 77.

Mobile numbering 

 Mobile numbering became 7–digit in the mid–1990s

Possible future changes 

All local numbers with the area code 01 are currently 7–digits, but may change to 8–digits in the future, although breaking the city into separate area codes would match the rest of the national system.

A review and public consultation on the future of Ireland's numbering plan was undertaken.

Historical numbering

Defunct non-geographic codes
 1850 – Local rate, shared cost, untimed
 1890 – Local rate, shared cost, timed
 076 or +353 76 – VoIP services

All of the above were withdrawn on 1 January 2022.

Defunct access codes
16  – former international access code
03 – formerly used for calls to Great Britain. The format was 03 + NDC code + local number.
08 – formerly used for Northern Ireland landlines
084 – formerly used for Belfast landlines

Defunct operator services
10 – national operator assistance (withdrawn in 2007)
114 – international operator assistance (withdrawn in 2007)
910 – operator-assisted calls to some areas without direct dialling (withdrawn in the early 1980s)
1190 – Telecom Éireann national directory assistance (withdrawn in the early 2000s and replaced with 11811, originally 190)
1197 – Telecom Éireann UK directory assistance (withdrawn in the early 2000s and replaced with 11818, originally 197)
1198 – Telecom Éireann international directory assistance (withdrawn in the early 2000s and replaced with 11818, originally 198)
191 – Telecom Éireann repair services (withdrawn in the late 1990s)
196 – telemessaging services, whereby callers could ask an operator to send a postcard with a printed message (withdrawn in the late 1990s)

A range of numbers from 192, 193 and 194 were once used for various Telecom Éireann customer service and account service lines.

Defunct information services
1191 – speaking clock (withdrawn on 27 August 2018)

Historical Northern Ireland access codes
 before 2000: 08 followed by Northern Irish area code and phone number e.g. Belfast 01232 xxx xxx was reached by dialling 08 01232 xxx xxx.

Belfast could previously be reached by dialling 084 in place of the UK area code 0232.

Historical Great Britain access codes

Until the early 1990s, the 03 numbering range was originally used for calls to Great Britain, including the Channel Islands and the Isle of Man, with the Irish prefix 030 replacing the UK trunk code 0.

Calls to British cities using the director telephone system were also possible using shorter codes:

031 – London (01)
032 – Birmingham (021)
033 – Edinburgh (031)
034 – Glasgow (041)
035 – Liverpool (051)
036 – Manchester (061)

031 was replaced with 03071 and 03081 when 01 was split into the area codes 071 and 081 in 1990.

Use of 03 for this purpose was discontinued in 1993, when the international access code changed from 16 to 00, with calls to Great Britain (but not Northern Ireland) requiring the country code +44 and the area code in full.

See also
List of dialling codes in the Republic of Ireland

References

Sources
ITU allocations list

External links
Comreg homepage
Comreg:Geographic Numbering Areas (pdf)

 
Ireland
Republic of Ireland-related lists